Gatanga may refer to:

Gatanga, Bururi, Burundi	
Gatanga, Makamba, Burundi	
Gatanga, Democratic Republic of the Congo
Gatanga, Kenya	
Gatanga, Sudan